Karl Weber (March 17, 1916 – July 30, 1990) was an actor in the era of old-time radio.

Early years
A native of Columbus Junction, Iowa, Weber attended Cornell College and was a graduate of the University of Iowa. He had three brothers and two sisters.

Stage
Before going into radio, Weber acted with Shakespearean troupes in the Midwest. In the late 1940s, he helped to found the New Stages off-Broadway group in New York City. His Broadway credits include The Land of Fame and Lady Behave.

Radio
Weber's roles in radio programs included those shown in the table below.

Television
Weber played Arthur Tate in Search for Tomorrow.

Film
Weber portrayed FBI agent Charlie Reynolds in Walk East on Beacon (1952).

Commercials
In the mid-1960s, Weber was featured in commercials for Avis Rent a Car. The company spent $6 million on the campaign in its first year. He also made commercials for Lyndon B. Johnson's and Nelson A. Rockefeller's campaigns for president.

Other activities
In 1968–1969, Weber was president of New York's chapter of the Screen Actors Guild. He also used his talent to record more than 200 books for the American Foundation for the Blind.

Personal life
Weber met his wife, Marjorie, when they were students at Cornell College. They had a daughter, Lynn, and two sons, Christopher and Mark.

Death
Weber died of congestive heart failure in Boston, Massachusetts, on July 30, 1990. He was 74.

References 

 

1916 births
1990 deaths
American male stage actors
American male radio actors
American male film actors
American male television actors
20th-century American male actors
Male actors from Iowa